Tarabai Modak (19 April 1892-1973) was born in Bombay. She graduated from the University of Mumbai in 1914.
She was married to a lawyer from Amravati, Mr. Modak.  Later she got a divorce in 1921.

She worked as a principal of a Women's College in Rajkot.
Being a social worker from Vidarbha region of Maharashtra, Balwadis were first developed by her. The first balwadi was started in Bordi a coastal village in Thane district of Maharashtra by Nutan Bal Shikshan Sangh.
She was awarded Padma Bhushan in 1962 for her work in preschool education.  Anutai Wagh was her disciple.
She was a member of the Indian National Congress.

Legacy
A play based on her life, Ghar Tighancha Hava, was produced by Ratnakar Matkari.

References

1892 births
1973 deaths
People from Mumbai
University of Mumbai alumni
Social workers
20th-century Indian educational theorists
Recipients of the Padma Bhushan in social work
19th-century Indian women
19th-century Indian people
20th-century Indian women scientists
Women educators from Maharashtra
Educators from Maharashtra
Social workers from Maharashtra
20th-century women educators